Baljit Singh Kharab (born 10 July 1956) is an Indian sports shooter. He competed in the men's 50 metre free pistol event at the 1984 Summer Olympics.

References

1956 births
Living people
Indian male sport shooters
Olympic shooters of India
Shooters at the 1984 Summer Olympics
Place of birth missing (living people)